Greystone House is a grade II* listed house in High Street, Devizes, Wiltshire, England. It was built between 1740 and 1744 with a front of Bath stone to a brick building with a hipped slate roof.

References 

Georgian architecture in Wiltshire
Grade II* listed buildings in Wiltshire
Grade II* listed houses
Residential buildings completed in 1744
Devizes
Houses in Wiltshire